Geoffrey VI (Goeffroy VI) (died 6 February 1250) was a Viscount of Châteaudun. He was the son of Geoffrey V, Viscount of Châteaudun, and Adelicia de Nevers.  Although Adelicia's ancestry is not precisely known, she is likely the daughter of William IV, Count of Nevers, and Eléonore, Countess of Vermandois.

Geoffrey married twice and produced two famous daughters.  His first wife was Mabile, of an unknown ancestry.  Geoffrey and Mabile had three children: Pierre (d. after 1251), a monk at an unknown abbey, Isabelle and Odette.

Geoffrey's second wife was Clemence de Roches, widow of Theobald VI, Count of Blois.  Geoffrey and Clemence had two children: 
Clemence, Viscountess of Châteaudun married Robert de Dreux, Seigneur de Beau, son of Robert III “Gasteblé”, Count of Dreux, great-grandson of Louis VI the Fat, King of France.  Clemence’s husband became the last Viscount of Châteaudun.
Jeanne, Dame de Châteaudun married first John I, Count of Montfort secondly, John II of Brienne, Grand Butler of France, son of John of Brienne, King of Jerusalem and Emperor of Constantinople, and Berenguela of León.

Geoffrey was succeeded by his daughter Clemence, who became the Viscountess of Châteaudun.

References

Sources

Further reading
 Settipani, Christian, Les vicomtes de Châteaudun et leurs alliés, dans Onomastique et Parenté dans l'Occident médiéval, Oxford, Linacre, Unit for Prosopographical Research, 2000
 Europäische Stammtafeln, Vol. III, Les Vicomtes de Châteaudun
 Medieval Lands Project, Vicomtes de Châteaudun

1250 deaths

Year of birth unknown
13th-century French people
Viscounts of Châteaudun
Christians of the Sixth Crusade